Haania is the type genus of Asian praying mantids in the new (2019) family Haaniidae. They are recorded from: southern China (Hainan), Indo-China and the Philippines.

Species
The Mantodea Species File and Catalogue of Life list:
 Haania aspera Werner, 1922
 Haania borneana Beier, 1952
 Haania confusa Kirby, 1904
 Haania dispar Werner, 1922
 Haania doroshenkoi Anisyutkin & Gorochov, 2004
 Haania lobiceps de Haan, 1842 - type species
 Haania orlovi Anisyutkin, 2005
 Haania philippina Giglio-Tos, 1915
 Haania simplex Beier, 1952
 Haania vitalisi Chopard, 1920

References

External links
Pictures on Up Close with Nature blog
 
 

Thespidae
Mantodea genera